Hematopoietic SH2 Domain Containing (HSH2D) protein is a protein encoded by the hematopoietic SH2 domain containing (HSH2D) gene.

Gene 
HSH2D is located on chromosome 19 at 19p13.11. Common aliases of the gene include HSH2 (Hematopoietic SH2 Protein) and ALX (Adaptor in Lymphocytes of Unknown Function X). The mRNA encodes two main isoforms. Isoform 1, the longest isoform, contains seven exons. The gene spans from 16134028 to 16158575.

mRNA 
Two main isoforms of HSH2D exist. Isoform 1 has seven exons and is 2,403 bp in length. Isoform 2 has six exons and is 2,936 bp long. Although isoform 2 has longer mRNA, it still produces the smaller isoform in the mature protein. Isoform 2 has a variant 5’ UTR and a different start codon, as well as a shorter N-terminus. The mRNA has a short 5' UTR and a long 3' UTR.

Protein 
The protein has a molecular weight of 39.0 kilodaltons (kD) and a pI of 6.678.  The main feature of the protein is the SH2 (Src homology) domain, which is a region that has phosphotyrosine receptors and is important in many signaling molecules. This domain is located from residues 26-127.

The secondary structure of the protein contains a helical section around residues 40-50, a sheet between 60-70, helices between 100-110, 135-145, 175-180, 200-225, and additional sheets between 235-240 and 295-300, shown in the figure at the bottom of the section (helices are purple arrows and sheets are red arrows). The protein has several locations of post-translational modifications, especially phosphorylation and GalNAc O-glycosylation, which has been shown to play a role in cancers.
The tertiary structure of the protein has not been confirmed through research, however, predictions using I-TASSER software are useful in visualizing the protein.

Expression 
Based on NCBI GEO expression profiles and EST analyses, the protein appears to be narrowly expressed throughout human tissues. It is highly expressed in bone marrow, CD4+ and CD8+ T cells, lymph node, mammary gland, spleen, stomach, thyroid, and small intestine tissue. Expression is elevated in cases of early T-cell precursor acute lymphoblastic leukemia and lowered in breast cancer cells that are treated with estrogen, suggesting an interaction between the protein and estrogen.

Function 
The function of the HSH2D protein is still not fully understood, however it has been shown to play a role in various cellular functions such as apoptosis, wound healing, vascular endothelial growth factors, membrane-associated intracellular trafficking, biogenesis of lipid droplets and collagen remodeling. It is also thought to play a role in T-cell activation.

Interacting proteins 
HSH2D interacts with several proto-oncogenes, including FES proto-oncogene (FES) and CRK proto-oncogene (CRK). It also has suspected interactions with other proteins such as tyrosine kinase non-receptor 2 (TRK2), PTEN-induced putative kinase (PINK1), and Interleukin 2 (IL2). A summary of these proteins is shown below with their suspected functions.

Clinical significance 
The HSH2D protein has been studied along other human genes predicted to be involved in the human immune system. HSH2D was found to be highly expressed in patients with ulcerative colitis. The protein is also associated with alpha-interferon activity.

Homology 
HSH2D has four distant paralogs and several orthologs in other species that have high levels of conservation.

Paralogs 
The four paralogs of HSH2D in humans are other proteins containing SH2 domains. They do not have a high level of conservation other than this domain. All paralogs were found through genecards

Orthologs 
HSH2D has several orthologous proteins that span across several orders of species. The protein was well conserved across mammals as well as a few reptiles, amphibians, and invertebrates. The following list is not exhaustive, rather, it shows the wide range of organisms that the protein may be found in. All orthologous proteins were found with BLAST or BLAT programs.

References 

Proteins